Archistratiomys is a genus of flies in the family Stratiomyidae.

Species
Archistratiomys luctifera (Philippi, 1865)
Archistratiomys rufipalpis (Wiedemann, 1830)

References

Stratiomyidae
Brachycera genera
Taxa named by Günther Enderlein
Diptera of North America
Diptera of South America